An independence referendum was held in Nevis on 10 August 1998. Although it was approved by 62% of voters, a two-thirds majority was necessary for the referendum to succeed. If it had passed, Nevis would have seceded from the Federation of Saint Kitts and Nevis.

Results

References

External links
1998 referendum Nevis Independence

1998 referendums
1998 in Saint Kitts and Nevis
Referendums in Saint Kitts and Nevis
Separatism in Saint Kitts and Nevis
Nevis
August 1998 events in North America